Christos Niaros (born 20 February 1990) is a Greek professional footballer who plays as a left-back for Super League 2 club Trikala, for which he is captain.

References

1990 births
Living people
Football League (Greece) players
Gamma Ethniki players
Ilioupoli F.C. players
Doxa Drama F.C. players
Acharnaikos F.C. players
Trikala F.C. players
Ergotelis F.C. players
A.E. Sparta P.A.E. players
Association football defenders
Footballers from Athens
Greek footballers